Leisure Time in an Elegant Setting is a painting by Dutch artist Pieter de Hooch, created c. 1663–1665. Done in oil on canvas, the painting depicts the interior of a Dutch home and two distinct conversations taking place. Leisure is in the collection of the Metropolitan Museum of Art, in New York.

Description
A noted painter during the Dutch golden age, Pieter de Hooch was especially skilled in the rendering of interior scenes. This skill can be seen in Leisure's richly decorated rooms and use of lighting. The painting also plays with the varying nature of conversations – showing a jovial, well-lit conversation (left) and a more mysterious conversation (right).

The painting was donated to the Met as part of the Robert Lehman Collection in 1975, and remains in the collection of the museum.

References

1660s paintings
Paintings by Pieter de Hooch
Paintings in the collection of the Metropolitan Museum of Art